Lygon (pronounced  ) is the surname of a British aristocratic family. Notable people with the surname include:

 William Lygon, 1st Earl Beauchamp (1747–1816), British politician
 William Lygon, 2nd Earl Beauchamp (1783–1823), British politician, son of the first earl
 Henry Lygon, 4th Earl Beauchamp (1784–1863), British soldier and politician, son of the first earl
 Edward Pyndar Lygon (1786–1860), British Army general and politician, son of the first earl
 Henry Lygon, 5th Earl Beauchamp (1829–1866), British politician, son of the fourth earl
 Frederick Lygon, 6th Earl Beauchamp (1830–1891), British Conservative politician, son of the fourth earl
 Lady Mary Lygon (1869–1927), after her marriage Lady Mary Trefusis (or Forbes-Trefusis), daughter of the sixth earl
 William Lygon, 7th Earl Beauchamp (1872–1938), British politician, leader of the Liberal Party, and Governor of New South Wales, son of the sixth earl
 William Lygon, 8th Earl Beauchamp (1903–1979), politician, son of the seventh earl
 Hugh Lygon (1904–1936), son of the seventh earl
 Lady Lettice Lygon (1906–1973), English socialite, daughter of the seventh earl
 Lady Sibell Lygon (1907–2005), English socialite, daughter of the seventh earl
 Lady Mary Lygon (1910–1982), Russian princess by marriage, daughter of the seventh earl
 Lady Dorothy Lygon (1912–2001), English socialite, daughter of the seventh earl

See also
Ligon  (disambiguation)
Lygon Street, Melbourne, Australia
Lygonia, a proprietary province in pre-colonial Maine

English-language surnames